The 2015 season was Fjölnir's 4th season in Úrvalsdeild and their 2nd consecutive season in top-flight of Icelandic Football.

Fjölnir was head coached by Ágúst Gylfason for the fourth consecutive season. He was assisted by player/assistant coach Ólafur Páll Snorrason.

Along with the Úrvalsdeild, the club competed in the Lengjubikarinn and Borgunarbikarinn.

The team finished the season in 6th place in the league.

First team

Transfers and loans

Transfers In

Transfers Out

Loans in

Loans out

Pre-season

Reykjavík Cup
Fjölnir took part in the 2015 Reykjavík Cup, a pre-season tournament for clubs from Reykjavík.

The team played in group A along with Fylkir, KR and Fram. Fjölnir finished top of the group with maximum points and went through to the semi-finals.

In the semi-finals Fjölnir lost to Valur 1–0.

Lengjubikarinn
Fjölnir were drawn in group 2 in the Icelandic league cup, Lengjubikarinn, along with KR, Víkingur R, Leiknir R, KA, Selfoss, Grótta and Fram.

Fjölnir finished 4th in the group with 10 points, 3 wins, 1 draw and 3 losses, but made it through to the quarter-finals because both Leiknir R and KR withdrew their teams from the competition.

In the quarter finals Fjölnir lost to ÍA 5–1, with Ragnar Leósson scoring Fjölnir's only goal.

Úrvalsdeild

League table

Matches

Summary of results

Points breakdown
 Points at home: 21
 Points away from home: 12
 6 Points: Leiknir R.
 4 Points: Fylkir, Keflavík, ÍA, Stjarnan
 3 Points: ÍBV, KR, Víkingur R.
 2 Points: Valur
 1 Point:
 0 Points: FH, Breiðablik

Borgunarbikarinn
Fjölnir came into the Icelandic cup, Borgunarbikarinn, in the 32nd-finals and were drawn against ÍA. Fjölnir won the game confidently 3–0.

In the 16th-finals the team was drawn against Víkingur Ó. Fjölnir won the game 4–0.

Fjölnir lost to KA in the quarter-finals 2–1. KA went 2–0 up after only 8 minutes and that good start got them the win and a place in the semi-finals.

Statistics

Goalscorers
Includes all competitive matches.

Appearances
Includes all competitive matches.
Numbers in parentheses are sub appearances

Disciplinary record
Includes all competitive matches.

References

External links
 Fjölnir Official Site

Fjolnir